The Benedictines, officially the Order of Saint Benedict (abbreviated as OSB), are a monastic religious order of the Catholic Church following the Rule of Saint Benedict. They are also sometimes called the Black Monks, in reference to the colour of their religious habits. They were founded by Benedict of Nursia, a 6th-century monk who laid the foundations of Benedictine monasticism through the formulation of his Rule of Saint Benedict.

Despite being called an order, the Benedictines do not operate under a single hierarchy but are instead organised as a collection of autonomous monasteries. The order is represented internationally by the Benedictine Confederation, an organisation set up in 1893 to represent the order's shared interests. They do not have a superior general or motherhouse with universal jurisdiction, but elect an Abbot Primate to represent themselves to the Vatican and to the world.

Historical development

The monastery at Subiaco in Italy, established by Benedict of Nursia  529, was the first of the dozen monasteries he founded. He later founded the Abbey of Monte Cassino. There is no evidence, however, that he intended to found an order and the Rule of Saint Benedict presupposes the autonomy of each community. When Monte Cassino was sacked by the Lombards about the year 580, the monks fled to Rome, and it seems probable that this constituted an important factor in the diffusion of a knowledge of Benedictine monasticism.

Copies of Benedict's Rule survived; around 594 Pope Gregory I spoke favorably of it.  The Rule is subsequently found in some monasteries in southern Gaul along with other rules used by abbots. Gregory of Tours says that at Ainay Abbey, in the sixth century, the monks "followed the rules of Basil, Cassian, Caesarius, and other fathers, taking and using whatever seemed proper to the conditions of time and place", and doubtless the same liberty was taken with the Benedictine Rule when it reached them. In Gaul and Switzerland, it gradually supplemented the much stricter Irish or Celtic Rule introduced by Columbanus and others. In many monasteries it eventually entirely displaced the earlier codes.

By the ninth century, however, the Benedictine had become the standard form of monastic life throughout the whole of Western Europe, excepting Scotland, Wales, and Ireland, where the Celtic observance still prevailed for another century or two. Largely through the work of Benedict of Aniane, it became the rule of choice for monasteries throughout the Carolingian empire.

Monastic scriptoria flourished from the ninth through the twelfth centuries. Sacred Scripture was always at the heart of every monastic scriptorium. As a general rule those of the monks who possessed skill as writers made this their chief, if not their sole active work. An anonymous writer of the ninth or tenth century speaks of six hours a day as the usual task of a scribe, which would absorb almost all the time available for active work in the day of a medieval monk.

In the Middle Ages monasteries were often founded by the nobility. Cluny Abbey was founded by William I, Duke of Aquitaine in 910. The abbey was noted for its strict adherence to the Rule of Saint Benedict. The abbot of Cluny was the superior of all the daughter houses, through appointed priors.

One of the earliest reforms of Benedictine practice was that initiated in 980 by Romuald, who founded the Camaldolese community. The Cistercians branched off from the Benedictines in 1098; they are often called the "White monks".

The dominance of the Benedictine monastic way of life began to decline towards the end of the twelfth century, which saw the rise of the Franciscans and Dominicans. Benedictines took a fourth vow of "stability", which professed loyalty to a particular foundation. Not being bound by location, the mendicants were better able to respond to an increasingly "urban" environment. This decline was further exacerbated by the practice of appointing a commendatory abbot, a lay person, appointed by a noble to oversee and to protect the goods of the monastery. Often, however, this resulted in the appropriation of the assets of monasteries at the expense of the community which they were intended to support.

England
The English Benedictine Congregation is the oldest of the nineteen Benedictine congregations. Through the influence of Wilfrid, Benedict Biscop, and Dunstan, the Benedictine Rule spread rapidly, and in the North it was adopted in most of the monasteries that had been founded by the Celtic missionaries from Iona. Many of the episcopal sees of England were founded and governed by the Benedictines, and no fewer than nine of the old cathedrals were served by the black monks of the priories attached to them. Monasteries served as hospitals and places of refuge for the weak and homeless. The monks studied the healing properties of plants and minerals to alleviate the sufferings of the sick.

During the English Reformation, all monasteries were dissolved and their lands confiscated by the Crown, forcing the members to flee into exile on the Continent. During the 19th century they were able to return to England.

St. Mildred's Priory, on the Isle of Thanet, Kent, was built in 1027 on the site of an abbey founded in 670 by the daughter of the first Christian King of Kent. Currently the priory is home to a community of Benedictine nuns. Five of the most notable English abbeys are the Basilica of St Gregory the Great at Downside, commonly known as Downside Abbey, The Abbey of St Edmund, King and Martyr commonly known as Douai Abbey in Upper Woolhampton, Reading, Berkshire, Ealing Abbey in Ealing, West London, and Worth Abbey. Prinknash Abbey, used by Henry VIII as a hunting lodge, was officially returned to the Benedictines four hundred years later, in 1928. During the next few years, so-called Prinknash Park was used as a home until it was returned to the order.

St. Lawrence's Abbey in Ampleforth, Yorkshire was founded in 1802. In 1955, Ampleforth set up a daughter house, a priory at St. Louis, Missouri which became independent in 1973 and became Saint Louis Abbey in its own right in 1989.

As of 2015, the English Congregation consists of three abbeys of nuns and ten abbeys of monks. Members of the congregation are found in England, Wales, the United States of America, Peru and Zimbabwe.

In England there are also houses of the Subiaco Cassinese Congregation: Farnborough, Prinknash, and Chilworth: the Solesmes Congregation, Quarr and St Cecilia's on the Isle of Wight, as well as a diocesan monastery following the Rule of Saint Benedict: The Community of Our Lady of Glastonbury.

Since the Oxford Movement, there has also been a modest flourishing of Benedictine monasticism in the Anglican Church and Protestant Churches. Anglican Benedictine Abbots are invited guests of the Benedictine Abbot Primate in Rome at Abbatial gatherings at Sant'Anselmo. There are an estimated 2,400 celibate Anglican Religious (1,080 men and 1,320 women) in the Anglican Communion as a whole, some of whom have adopted the Rule of Saint Benedict.

In 1168 local Benedictine monks instigated the anti-semitic blood libel of Harold of Gloucester as a template for explaining later deaths. According to historian Joe Hillaby, the blood libel of Harold was crucially important because for the first time an unexplained child death occurring near the Easter festival was arbitrarily linked to Jews in the vicinity by local Christian churchmen: "they established a pattern quickly taken up elsewhere. Within three years the first ritual murder charge was made in France."

Monastic libraries in England
The forty-eighth Rule of Saint Benedict prescribes extensive and habitual "holy reading" for the brethren. Three primary types of reading were done by the monks during this time. Monks would read privately during their personal time, as well as publicly during services and at meal times. In addition to these three mentioned in the Rule, monks would also read in the infirmary. Monasteries were thriving centers of education, with monks and nuns actively encouraged to learn and pray according to the Benedictine Rule. Section 38 states that ‘these brothers’ meals should usually be accompanied by reading, and that they were to eat and drink in silence while one read out loud.

Benedictine monks were not allowed worldly possessions, thus necessitating the preservation and collection of sacred texts in monastic libraries for communal use. For the sake of convenience, the books in the monastery were housed in a few different places, namely the sacristy, which contained books for the choir and other liturgical books, the rectory, which housed books for public reading such as sermons and lives of the saints, and the library, which contained the largest collection of books and was typically in the cloister.

The first record of a monastic library in England is in Canterbury. To assist with Augustine of Canterbury's English mission, Pope Gregory the Great gave him nine books which included the Gregorian Bible in two volumes, the Psalter of Augustine, two copies of the Gospels, two martyrologies, an Exposition of the Gospels and Epistles, and a Psalter. Theodore of Tarsus brought Greek books to Canterbury more than seventy years later, when he founded a school for the study of Greek.

France
Monasteries were among the institutions of the Catholic Church swept away during the French Revolution. Monasteries were again allowed to form in the 19th century under the Bourbon Restoration. Later that century, under the Third French Republic, laws were enacted preventing religious teaching. The original intent was to allow secular schools. Thus in 1880 and 1882, Benedictine teaching monks were effectively exiled; this was not completed until 1901.

Germany
Saint Blaise Abbey in the Black Forest of Baden-Württemberg is believed to have been founded around the latter part of the tenth century. Between 1070 and 1073 there seem to have been contacts between St. Blaise and the Cluniac Abbey of Fruttuaria in Italy, which led to St. Blaise following the Fruttuarian reforms. The Empress Agnes was a patron of Fruttuaria, and retired there in 1065 before moving to Rome. The Empress was instrumental in introducing Fruttuaria's Benedictine customs, as practiced at Cluny, to Saint Blaise Abbey in Baden-Württemberg. Other houses either reformed by, or founded as priories of, St. Blasien were: Muri Abbey (1082), Ochsenhausen Abbey (1093), Göttweig Abbey (1094), Stein am Rhein Abbey (before 1123) and Prüm Abbey (1132). It also had significant influence on the abbeys of Alpirsbach (1099), Ettenheimmünster (1124) and Sulzburg (ca. 1125), and the priories of Weitenau (now part of Steinen, ca. 1100), Bürgel (before 1130) and Sitzenkirch (ca. 1130).

Switzerland
Kloster Rheinau was a Benedictine monastery in Rheinau in the Canton of Zürich, Switzerland, founded in about 778. The abbey of Our Lady of the Angels was founded in 1120.

United States 

The first Benedictine to live in the United States was Pierre-Joseph Didier. He came to the United States in 1790 from Paris and served in the Ohio and St. Louis areas until his death. The first actual Benedictine monastery founded was Saint Vincent Archabbey, located in Latrobe, Pennsylvania. It was founded in 1832 by Boniface Wimmer, a German monk, who sought to serve German immigrants in America. In 1856, Wimmer started to lay the foundations for St. John's Abbey in Minnesota. In 1876, Herman Wolfe, of Saint Vincent Archabbey established Belmont Abbey in North Carolina. By the time of his death in 1887, Wimmer had sent Benedictine monks to Kansas, New Jersey, North Carolina, Georgia, Florida, Alabama, Illinois, and Colorado.

Wimmer also asked for Benedictine sisters to be sent to America by St. Walburg Convent in Eichstätt, Bavaria. In 1852, Sister Benedicta Riepp and two other sisters founded St. Marys, Pennsylvania. Soon they would send sisters to Michigan, New Jersey, and Minnesota.

By 1854, Swiss monks began to arrive and founded St. Meinrad Abbey in Indiana, and they soon spread to Arkansas and Louisiana. They were soon followed by Swiss sisters.

There are now over 100 Benedictine houses across America. Most Benedictine houses are part of one of four large Congregations: American-Cassinese, Swiss-American, St. Scholastica, and St. Benedict. The congregations mostly are made up of monasteries that share the same lineage. For instance the American-Cassinese congregation included the 22 monasteries that descended from Boniface Wimmer.

Benedictine vow and life

The sense of community was a defining characteristic of the order since the beginning.  Section 17 in chapter 58 of the Rule of Saint Benedict states the solemn promise candidates for reception into a Benedictine community are required to make: a promise of stability (i.e. to remain in the same community), conversatio morum (an idiomatic Latin phrase suggesting "conversion of manners"; see below) and obedience to the community's superior. This solemn commitment tends to be referred to as the "Benedictine vow" and is the Benedictine antecedent and equivalent of the evangelical counsels professed by candidates for reception into a religious order.

Much scholarship over the last fifty years has been dedicated to the translation and interpretation of "conversatio morum".  The older translation "conversion of life" has generally been replaced with phrases such as "[conversion to] a monastic manner of life", drawing from the Vulgate's use of conversatio as a translation of "citizenship" or "homeland" in Philippians 3:20.  Some scholars have claimed that the vow formula of the Rule is best translated as "to live in this place as a monk, in obedience to its rule and abbot."

Benedictine abbots and abbesses have full jurisdiction of their abbey and thus absolute authority over the monks or nuns who are resident.  This authority includes the power to assign duties, to decide which books may or may not be read, to regulate comings and goings, and to punish and to excommunicate, in the sense of an enforced isolation from the monastic community.

A tight communal timetablethe horariumis meant to ensure that the time given by God is not wasted but used in God's service, whether for prayer, work, meals, spiritual reading or sleep. The order's motto Ora et Labora ("pray and work") may be said to summarize its way of life.

Although Benedictines do not take a vow of silence, hours of strict silence are set, and at other times silence is maintained as much as is practically possible. Social conversations tend to be limited to communal recreation times. But such details, like the many other details of the daily routine of a Benedictine house that the Rule of Saint Benedict leaves to the discretion of the superior, are set out in its 'customary'. A ' customary' is the code adopted by a particular Benedictine house, adapting the Rule to local conditions.

In the Roman Catholic Church, according to the norms of the 1983 Code of Canon Law, a Benedictine abbey is a "religious institute" and its members are therefore members of the consecrated life. While Canon Law 588 §1 explains that Benedictine monks are "neither clerical nor lay", they can, however, be ordained.

Some monasteries adopt a more active ministry in living the monastic life, running schools or parishes; others are more focused on contemplation, with more of an emphasis on prayer and work within the confines of the cloister.

Benedictines' rules contained ritual purification, and inspired by Benedict of Nursia encouragement for the practice of therapeutic bathing; Benedictine monks played a role in the development and promotion of spas.

Organization
Benedictine monasticism is fundamentally different from other Western religious orders insofar as its individual communities are not part of a religious order with "Generalates" and "Superiors General". Each Benedictine house is independent and governed by an abbot.

In modern times, the various groups of autonomous houses (national, reform, etc.) have formed themselves loosely into congregations (for example, Cassinese, English, Solesmes, Subiaco, Camaldolese, Sylvestrines). These, in turn, are represented in the Benedictine Confederation that came into existence through Pope Leo XIII's Apostolic Brief "Summum semper" on 12 July 1893. Additionally, Pope Leo established the office of Abbot Primate as the abbot elected to represent this Confederation to the Vatican and to the world. The headquarters for the Benedictine Confederation and the Abbot Primate is the Primatial Abbey of Sant'Anselmo built by Pope Leo XIII and located in Rome, Italy.

In 1313 Bernardo Tolomei established the Order of Our Lady of Mount Olivet. The community adopted the Rule of Saint Benedict and received canonical approval in 1344. The Olivetans are part of the Benedictine Confederation.

Other orders
The Rule of Saint Benedict is also used by a number of religious orders that began as reforms of the Benedictine tradition such as the Cistercians and Trappists. These groups are separate congregations and not members of the Benedictine Confederation.

Although Benedictines are traditionally Catholic, there are also some communities that follow the Rule of Saint Benedict within the Anglican Communion, Eastern Orthodox Church, and Lutheran Church.

Notable Benedictines

Saints and Blesseds

Monks
Henri Quentin

Popes

Founders of abbeys and congregations and prominent reformers

Scholars, historians, and spiritual writers

Maurists 
Members of the Congregation of Saint Maur, a prerevolutionary French congregation of Benedictines known for their scholarship:

Bishops and martyrs

Twentieth century

Nuns

Oblates

Benedictine Oblates endeavor to embrace the spirit of the Benedictine vow in their own life in the world. Oblates are affiliated with a particular monastery.

See also

 Dom Pierre Pérignon
 Benedictine Confederation
 Catholic religious order
 Cistercians
 French Romanesque architecture
 Sisters of Social Service
 Trappists

References

Further reading

 Dom Columba Marmion, Christ the Ideal of the Monk – Spiritual Conferences on the Monastic and Religious Life (Engl. edition London 1926, trsl. from the French by a nun of Tyburn Convent).
 Mariano Dell'Omo, Storia del monachesimo occidentale dal medioevo all'età contemporanea. Il carisma di san Benedetto tra VI e XX secolo. Jaca Book, Milano 2011.

External links

 
  Confoederatio Benedictina Ordinis Sancti Benedicti, the Benedictine Confederation of Congregations
 Links of the Congregations
 Saint Vincent Archabbey
 Boniface WIMMER
 The Alliance for International Monasticism
 Benedictines – Abbey of Dendermonde in ODIS – Online Database for Intermediary Structures
 Benedictine rule for nuns in Middle English, Manuscript, ca. 1320, at The Library of Congress

 
 
Catholic spirituality
Institutes of consecrated life